Rairakhol State was a princely state during the British Raj in what is today India. It was one of the Chota Nagpur States and had its capital at Rairakhol (Redhakhol), located in the present-day Sambalpur district of Odisha.

Most of the state was covered by forest where wild elephants used to roam. Rairakhol State's inhabitants spoke mostly the Odia language, although there were also large Kol people groups speaking Munda and Oraon language. The Chasa caste was the predominant caste in the state.

History
Although records are obscure but according to traditions, around 17th century a branch of Kadamba dynasty of the Bonai State was ruling in the region and the chiefs were feudatories of the Bamra State until the 18th century, when the rulers of the Sambalpur State freed it from its dependence.

During the 19th century, Raja Bishan Chandra Jenamuni whose reign lasted 75 years, was recognized as Raja and in 1867 a sanad was granted by the British recognizing Rairakhol as a state in its own right. The state was under the political control of the Commissioner of the Chhattisgarh Division of the Central Provinces until 1905, coming then under the Bengal Presidency. His successor Gaura Chandra Deo adopted Bir Chandra Jadumani Deo Jenamuni, a scion of the Kadamba dynasty branch of Bonai as his successor. On 1 January 1948, he signed the instrument of accession to the Indian Union. The princely state then became part of the Sambalpur district.

Rulers 
The rulers of Rairakhol State of the Kadamba dynasty branch:

 1 Bishan Chandra Jenamuni (1825 – )
 2 Gaura Chandra Deo ( – )
 3 Bir Chandra Jadumani Deo Jenamuni ( – )

Titular
 3 Bir Chandra Jadumani Deo Jenamuni ( – )
 4 Girish Chandra Jadumani Deo Jenamuni ( – )
 5 Hari Shankar Jadumani Deo Jenamuni ( – )
 6 Nav Chandra Deo ( - current)

See also
Eastern States Agency
Orissa Tributary States

References

Princely states of Odisha
History of Odisha
Sambalpur district
States and territories disestablished in 1948